Coluzea faceta is a species of large sea snail, marine gastropod mollusk in the family Columbariidae.

Description

Distribution

References

 Harasewych M.G. (1991) Mollusca Gastropoda : Columbariform gastropods of New Caledonia. In: A Crosnier & P. Bouchet (eds), Résultats des Campagnes Musorstom 7. Mémoires du Muséum National d\'Histoire Naturelle, ser. A, 150: 243-259

Columbariidae
Gastropods described in 1991